Frederick Dean (1 September 1880 – 1 September 1946) was a Cornish rugby union player who played for Devonport Albion now Plymouth Albion R.F.C. Fred was capped 29 times for Cornwall and was a member of the famous 1908 team that beat Durham in the County Championship final 17-3 at Redruth.

He was also a member of the Cornwall XV that represented the Great Britain rugby union in the 1908 Summer Olympics which on 26 October 1908 won the Olympic silver medal at White City Stadium losing to Australia in the final. He was born in Plymouth and died in Devonport, Devon.

See also
Cornish rugby

References

External links

Cornish rugby union players
Olympic rugby union players of Great Britain
Olympic silver medallists for Great Britain
Plymouth Albion R.F.C. players
Rugby union players at the 1908 Summer Olympics
1880 births
1946 deaths
Medalists at the 1908 Summer Olympics